Asura is a genus of moths in the subfamily Arctiinae, and subtribe Nudariina erected by Francis Walker in 1854.

Species

 Asura albidorsalis Wileman, 1914
 Asura albigrisea (Rothschild, 1913)
 Asura alikangiae (Strand, 1917)
 Asura amabilis Rothschild & Jordan, 1901
 Asura andamana (Moore, 1877)
 Asura anomala (Elwes, 1890)
 Asura arcuata (Moore, 1882)
 Asura arenaria Rothschild, 1913
 Asura asaphes Hampson, 1900
 Asura atritermina Hampson, 1900
 Asura aurantiaca (Moore, 1878)
 Asura aureata Rothschild, 1913
 Asura aureorosea (Rothschild, 1913)
 Asura aurora (Hampson, 1891)
 Asura avernalis (Butler, 1887)
 Asura bipars (Walker, 1865)
 Asura bipartita Rothschild, 1916
 Asura biplagiata (Rothschild, 1913)
 Asura biseriata Hampson, 1900
 Asura bizonoides (Walker, 1862)
 Asura brunneofasciata Bethune-Baker, 1904
 Asura calamaria (Moore, 1888)
 Asura camerunensis Strand, 1912
 Asura carnea (Poujade, 1886)
 Asura catameces Turner, 1940
 Asura cervicalis Walker, 1854
 Asura chrysomela Hampson, 1905
 Asura coccineoflammens Rothschild, 1913
 Asura coccinocosma Turner, 1940
 Asura compsodes Turner, 1940
 Asura confina Hampson, 1900
 Asura congerens (Felder, 1874)
 Asura congoensis Kühne, 2007
 Asura conjunctana (Walker, 1866)
 Asura connexa (Wileman, 1910)
 Asura creatina (Snellen, 1879)
 Asura crocopepla Turner, 1940
 Asura crocoptera Turner, 1940
 Asura crocota Hampson, 1900
 Asura cruciata Matsumura, 1927
 Asura cuneifera (Walker, 1862)
 Asura cuneigera (Walker, 1862)
 Asura cylletona (Swinhoe, 1893)
 Asura dasara (Moore, 1859)
 Asura dentifera Hampson, 1900
 Asura dharma (Moore, 1879)
 Asura diluta Draeseke, 1926
 Asura dinawa Bethune-Baker, 1904
 Asura discisigna (Moore, 1878)
 Asura disticha (Meyrick, 1894)
 Asura distyi Kühne, 2007
 Asura doa Kühne, 2007
 Asura eala Kühne, 2007
 Asura ecmelaena Hampson, 1900
 Asura eichhorni Rothschild, 1936
 Asura elegans Reich, 1937
 Asura eos Hampson, 1900
 Asura erythrias (Holland, 1893)
 Asura esmia (Swinhoe, 1894)
 Asura euprepioides (Walker, 1862)
 Asura flavagraphia van Eecke, 1929
 Asura flaveola Bethune-Baker, 1904
 Asura flavida (Butler, 1887)
 Asura flavivenosa (Moore, 1878)
 Asura floccosa (Walker, 1864)
 Asura friederikeae Kühne, 2007
 Asura frigida (Walker, 1854)
 Asura fulvimarginata Hampson, 1904
 Asura furcata Reich, 1936
 Asura fuscalis (Hampson, 1891)
 Asura gigantea Kühne, 2007
 Asura griseata (Leech, 1899)
 Asura haemachroa Hampson, 1905
 Asura hemixantha Hampson, 1900
 Asura hermanni Kühne, 2007
 Asura hilaris (Walker, 1854)
 Asura hopkinsi Tams, 1935
 Asura horishanella Matsumura, 1927
 Asura humilis (Walker, 1854)
 Asura ila (Moore, 1859)
 Asura inconspicua (Moore, 1878)
 Asura infumata (Felder, 1874)
 Asura insularis Rothschild, 1913
 Asura intermedia Marumo, 1923
 Asura irregularis (Rothschild, 1913)
 Asura latimargo Roepke, 1946
 Asura likiangensis Daniel, 1952
 Asura liparidia Rothschild, 1913
 Asura lutara (Moore, [1860])
 Asura lutarella Kalis, 1934
 Asura lutea Bethune-Baker, 1908
 Asura luzonica Wileman & South, 1919
 Asura lydia Donovan, 1805
 Asura magica Strand, 1917
 Asura manusi Rothschild, 1916
 Asura marginata (Walker, 1864)
 Asura marginatana Strand, 1922
 Asura mediofascia Rothschild, 1913
 Asura megala Hampson, 1900
 Asura melanoleuca (Hampson, 1894)
 Asura melanopyga Hampson, 1918
 Asura melanoxantha Hampson, 1914
 Asura metahyala Hampson, 1918
 Asura metamelas (Hampson, 1893)
 Asura metascota Hampson, 1905
 Asura miltochristina Rothschild, 1913
 Asura mimetica Rothschild, 1913
 Asura modesta (Leech, 1899)
 Asura monospila Turner, 1940
 Asura mutabilis Kühne, 2007
 Asura nebulosa (Moore, 1878)
 Asura nigriciliata Hampson, 1900
 Asura nigripuncta Wileman
 Asura nigrivena (Leech, 1899)
 Asura nubifascia (Walker, 1864)
 Asura nubilalis (Hampson, 1894)
 Asura obliquilinea (Swinhoe, 1901)
 Asura obscurodiscalis Rothschild, 1936
 Asura obsoleta (Moore, 1878)
 Asura ocellata Wileman
 Asura ochreomaculata Bethune-Baker, 1904
 Asura ocnerioides Rothschild, 1913
 Asura octiger van Eecke, 1929
 Asura orsova Swinhoe, 1903
 Asura owgarra Bethune-Baker, 1908
 Asura parallelina (Hampson, 1894)
 Asura parallina (Hampson, 1894)
 Asura peloa (Swinhoe, 1904)
 Asura percurrens Hampson, 1914
 Asura perihaemia Hampson, 1900
 Asura phaeobasis Hampson, 1900
 Asura phaeoplagia Hampson, 1900
 Asura phaeosticta Kiriakoff, 1958
 Asura phantasma Hampson, 1907
 Asura pinkurata Kühne, 2007
 Asura platyrhabda Tams, 1935
 Asura polyspila Turner, 1940
 Asura postbicolor Rothschild, 1913
 Asura pseudojosiodes Rothschild, 1913
 Asura pudibunda Hampson, 1900
 Asura punctilineata Wileman & South, 1919
 Asura pyropa Tams, 1935
 Asura pyrostrota Hampson, 1914
 Asura quadrilineata (Pagenstecher, 1886)
 Asura reversa Rothschild, 1916
 Asura rhabdota Rothschild, 1920
 Asura rosacea Bethune-Baker, 1904
 Asura roseogrisea Rothschild, 1913
 Asura rubricosa (Moore, 1878)
 Asura rubrimargo (Hampson, 1894)
 Asura ruenca (Swinhoe, 1892)
 Asura ruptifascia (Hampson, 1893)
 Asura russula Kiriakoff, 1963
 Asura sagittaria Bethune-Baker, 1904
 Asura semifascia (Walker, 1854)
 Asura semivitrea (Rothschild, 1913)
 Asura septemmaculata (Heylaerts, 1891)
 Asura serratilinea (Turner, 1940)
 Asura sexpuncta (Hampson, 1894)
 Asura simillima Rothschild, 1936
 Asura simplifascia (Elwes, 1890)
 Asura snelleni Roepke, 1943
 Asura solita (Walker, 1854)
 Asura spinata Kühne, 2007
 Asura striata Wileman, 1910
 Asura strigatula Rothschild, 1913
 Asura strigibasis de Joannis, 1930
 Asura strigipennis (Herrich-Schaffer, 1914)
 Asura subcruciata Rothschild, 1913
 Asura synestramena Hampson, 1900
 Asura temperata (Holland, 1893)
 Asura thomensis Rothschild, 1913
 Asura toxodes Hampson, 1907
 Asura tricolor (Wileman, 1910)
 Asura trifasciata Roepke, 1946
 Asura tripuncta (Reich, 1935)
 Asura trizonata Rothschild, 1913
 Asura truncata (Rothschild, 1913)
 Asura umbrifera Hampson, 1900
 Asura umbrosa (Hampson, 1896)
 Asura undulosa (Walker, 1854)
 Asura unicolora Bethune-Baker, 1904
 Asura uniformeola Hampson, 1900
 Asura uniformis (Hampson, 1893)
 Asura unilinea Wileman
 Asura unipuncta (Leech, 1890)
 Asura varians (Hampson, 1893)
 Asura versicolor Kühne, 2007
 Asura vivida (Walker, [1865])
 Asura wandammensis Joicey & Talbot, 1916
 Asura xanthophaea Toulgoët, 1977
 Asura zebrina (Hampson, 1914)

Former species 

The following species were previously associated with Asura. Species formerly placed in this genus are now in genera Lyclene, Afrasura, Gymnasura, Cyme, Ghoria, Barsine, other genera, or resolved as synonyms of other Asura species.

 Asura acteola
 Asura aegrota
 Asura agraphia
 Asura anaemica
 Asura analogus
 Asura anila
 Asura antemedialis
 Asura aroa
 Asura assamica
 Asura asuroides
 Asura atricraspeda
 Asura atrifusa
 Asura basitessellata
 Asura bella
 Asura biagi
 Asura birivula
 Asura bougainvillei
 Asura bougainvillicola
 Asura butleri
 Asura callinoma
 Asura cancellata
 Asura celidopa
 Asura celipodoa
 Asura chromatica
 Asura chypsilon
 Asura circumdata
 Asura citrinopuncta
 Asura citronopuncta
 Asura clara
 Asura clavula
 Asura coccineoflammea
 Asura conflua
 Asura confluens
 Asura craigi
 Asura crenulata
 Asura crustata
 Asura curvifascia
 Asura cyclota
 Asura dampierensis
 Asura decisigna
 Asura decurrens
 Asura dentiferoides
 Asura depuncta
 Asura diffusa
 Asura dirhabdus
 Asura discistriga
 Asura discocellularis
 Asura discoidalis
 Asura dividata
 Asura duplicata
 Asura effulgens
 Asura eschara
 Asura evora
 Asura excurrens
 Asura fasciolata
 Asura feminina
 Asura flagrans
 Asura flavescens
 Asura floridensis
 Asura formosicola
 Asura fruhstorferi
 Asura fulguritis
 Asura fulvia
 Asura fusca
 Asura fuscifera
 Asura fuscifusa
 Asura gabunica
 Asura gaudens
 Asura geminata
 Asura geodetis
 Asura griseotincta
 Asura grisescens
 Asura guntheri
 Asura habrotis
 Asura hieroglyphica
 Asura hilara
 Asura homogena
 Asura hyporhoda
 Asura ichorina
 Asura inclusa
 Asura incompleta
 Asura indecisa
 Asura inornata
 Asura intensa
 Asura interserta
 Asura intrita
 Asura isabelina
 Asura javanica
 Asura kangrana
 Asura ktimuna
 Asura lacteoflava
 Asura limbata
 Asura mediastina
 Asura mediopuncta
 Asura melitaula
 Asura mienshanica
 Asura miltochristaemorpha
 Asura moluccensis
 Asura mylea
 Asura natalensis
 Asura neavi
 Asura numida
 Asura obliqua
 Asura obliquata
 Asura obliterans
 Asura obliterata
 Asura obsolescens
 Asura ochracea
 Asura ochrostraminea
 Asura pallida
 Asura pectinata
 Asura pectinella
 Asura peripherica
 Asura perpusilla
 Asura phryctopa
 Asura phryctops
 Asura placens
 Asura porphyrea
 Asura postfasciatus
 Asura postfusca
 Asura postica
 Asura pseudaurora
 Asura punctata
 Asura punctifascia
 Asura punctilinea
 Asura pyraula
 Asura pyrauloides
 Asura quadrifasciata
 Asura reducta
 Asura reticulata
 Asura rhodina
 Asura rivulosa
 Asura rosea
 Asura rubricans
 Asura rufostria
 Asura rufotincta
 Asura sagenaria
 Asura samboanganus
 Asura scripta
 Asura semicirculata
 Asura senara
 Asura sexualis
 Asura signata
 Asura simplicifascia
 Asura simulans
 Asura sinica
 Asura spurrelli
 Asura straminea
 Asura strigata
 Asura strigulata
 Asura suavis
 Asura subcervina
 Asura subfulvia
 Asura submarmorata
 Asura suffusa
 Asura sullia
 Asura szetschwanica
 Asura tabida
 Asura terminata
 Asura tessellata
 Asura tibada
 Asura triangularis
 Asura undulata
 Asura unifascia
 Asura variabilis
 Asura violacea
 Asura wandammenensae
 Asura xantha
 Asura xantherythra

References

 Kühne (2007). Esperiana Buchreihe zur Entomologie. Memoir 3: 353–394.

 Wallengren (1860). Wiener Entomologisehe Monatschrift. 4 (2): 46.

 
Nudariina
Moth genera